Ordinary Heroes, published in 2005, is a novel by Scott Turow. It tells the story of Stewart Dubinsky, a journalist who uncovers writings of his father while going through his things following his funeral. The novel, told in first person, traces Stewart's uncovering of his father David's role in World War II in the European Theatre as a captain in the U.S. Army Judge Advocate General's Corps. It includes scenes set during the Battle of the Bulge. This develops into a startling revelation about who Dubinsky's mother really is and how his father came to meet her. 

Many of the minor characters in Ordinary Heroes also appear in other Turow novels, which are all set in fictional, Midwestern Kindle County.

Kindle County
2005 American novels
Novels by Scott Turow
Novels set during World War II
Novels about journalists
Farrar, Straus and Giroux books